The 2014 Men's Hockey Champions Trophy was the 35th edition of the Hockey Champions Trophy men's field hockey tournament. From this year on the tournament began to be held biennially due to the introduction of the Hockey World League, returning to its original format changed in 1980.

Germany won the tournament for the tenth time after defeating Pakistan 2–0 in the final. Australia won the third place match by defeating India 2–1.

Qualification
Alongside the host nation, the top five finishers from the previous edition and the winner of the 2012 Champions Challenge I qualified automatically. The remaining spots were nominated by the FIH Executive Board, making a total of 8 competing teams.

 (Host nation, and fourth in the 2012 Champions Trophy)
 (Defending champions)
 (Second in 2012 Champions Trophy)
 (Third in 2012 Champions Trophy)
 (Fifth in 2012 Champions Trophy)
 (Winner of 2012 Champions Challenge I)
 (Nominated by FIH Executive Board)
 (Nominated by FIH Executive Board)

Umpires
Below are the 10 umpires appointed by the International Hockey Federation:

Chen Dekang (CHN)
Eduardo Lizana (ESP)
Fernando Gómez (ARG)
Gareth Greenfield (NZL)
Andrew Kennedy (ENG)
Deon Nel (RSA)
Raghu Prasad (IND)
Coen van Bunge (NED)
Paco Vázquez (ESP)
Peter Wright (RSA)

Results
All times are Indian Standard Time (UTC+05:30)

First round

Pool A

Pool B

Second round

Quarterfinals

Fifth to eighth place classification

Crossover

Seventh and eighth place

Fifth and sixth place

First to fourth place classification

Semi-finals

Third and fourth place

Final

Statistics

Final standings

Awards

Goalscorers

References

External links
Official website

Champions Trophy (field hockey)
Champions Trophy
2014 Men's Hockey Champions Trophy
Men's Hockey Champions Trophy
Men's Hockey Champions Trophy
Sport in Bhubaneswar